Salem is the name of four places in the U.S. state of Arkansas:
Salem, Fulton County, Arkansas, a city in northern Arkansas
Salem, Ouachita County, Arkansas
Salem, Pike County, Arkansas
Salem, Saline County, Arkansas, a census-designated place in central Arkansas